Raiamas scarciensis is a species of ray-finned fish in the genus Raiamas.

References 

Raiamas
Fish described in 1989